Medvedje Brdo is a dispersed settlement in the Rovte Hills northwest of Logatec in the Inner Carniola region of Slovenia.

Name
Medvedje Brdo was attested in historical documents as S. Kathrein in 1496, referring to Saint Catherine's Church in the village. The name Medvedje Brdo literally means 'bear hill', but like similar place names (e.g., Medvedjek, Medvedje selo, Medvedce) it may be derived from an animal-based surname rather than directly from the zoonym itself.

Church

The local church in the settlement is dedicated to Saint Catherine and belongs to the Parish of Zavratec.

References

External links

Medvedje Brdo on Geopedia

Populated places in the Municipality of Logatec